The 2010s oil glut  is a significant surplus of crude oil that started in 2014–2015 and accelerated in 2016, with multiple causes. They include general oversupply as unconventional US and Canadian tight oil (shale oil) production reached critical volumes, geopolitical rivalries among oil-producing nations, falling demand across commodities markets due to the deceleration of the Chinese economy, and possible restraint of long-term demand as environmental policy promotes fuel efficiency and steers an increasing share of energy consumption away from fossil fuels.

The world price of oil was above US in 2012, and remained relatively strong above $100 until September 2014, after which it entered a sharp downward spiral, falling below $30 by January 2016.

In December 2015, The Telegraph quoted a major oil broker stating: "The world is floating in oil. The numbers we are facing now are dreadful" – and Forbes magazine stated: "The ongoing oil price slump has more or less morphed into a complete rout, with profound long-term implications for the industry as a whole."

As 2016 continued, the price gradually rose back into the $40s, with the world waiting to see if and when and how the market would return to balance.

In October 2018, Brent prices had recovered to their pre-2015 levels, peaking at $86.29 a barrel on 3 October. Soon after, however, prices began a collapse as fears over the global economy and fast-increasing shale production began to take hold.

The following month, Brent prices fell approximately 22%, constituting the largest monthly loss in a decade, ending the month at $59.46 per barrel on 30 November.

In early 2022, Brent prices had recovered to their pre-2015 levels for a second time, exceeding the prices reached in October 2018.

Unsustainable prices

The global economy after the Great Recession was particularly weak compared to before. In 2006, over 100 nations achieved economic growth over 5% annually; in 2014, roughly 50 nations achieved over 5% growth. Many large economies, like the EU, US, and China, were unable to support 2005 levels of growth, and China almost fell into its own financial crisis during its 2015 stock market bubble and crash. Oil demand growth, as a result of all this, dropped.

On 6 April 2014, writing in a Saudi Arabian journal, World Pensions Forum economist Nicolas J. Firzli warned that the escalating oversupply situation could have durably negative economic consequences for all Gulf Cooperation Council member states:

Causes

North American oil production increases
U.S. oil production nearly doubled from 2008 levels, due to substantial improvements in shale "fracking" technology in response to record oil prices. The steady rise in additional output, mostly from North Dakota, West Texas, Oklahoma, and several other US states eventually led to a plunge in U.S. oil import requirements and a record high volume of worldwide oil inventories in storage.

Canada also significantly increased oil production during the 2000s oil crisis, mostly in Alberta in the form of the Athabasca oil sands, though a transportation and logistics crisis in Alberta has slowed continued growth in supplies.

Global Growth slowing
The 2015–16 Chinese stock market turbulence slowed the growth of the economy in China, restraining its demand for oil and other industrial commodities. China's fast rising debt pile, especially since 2008, has also led to concerns about a Chinese financial crisis and/or Chinese recession, which led to significant volatility and loss of asset value in other world markets.

China's slowing economy led to many other economies slowing or falling into recession, and the end of Quantitative Easing in the United States also contributed. Many developing nations borrowed heavily in foreign currencies, which has fueled worries over a balance of payments crisis or debt defaults.

Geopolitical rivalries
In spite of longstanding geopolitical rivalries – notably the GCC bloc versus Iran and Venezuela – emerging markets oil producers within and outside OPEC maintained at least some output discipline until the fall of 2014, when Saudi Arabia advocated higher OPEC production and lower price levels to erode the profitability of high-cost shale oil production.

It has been suggested that the Iran–Saudi Arabia proxy conflict was a powerful influence in the Saudi decision to launch the price war, as was Cold War rivalry between the United States and Russia. Larry Elliott argued that "with the help of its Saudi ally, Washington is trying to drive down the oil price by flooding an already weak market with crude. As the Russians and the Iranians are heavily dependent on oil exports, the assumption is that they will become easier to deal with." Vice President of Russia's largest oil company, Rosneft, accused Saudi Arabia of conspiring against Russia.

Some geoeconomics experts have argued that the Saudi – Qatari rivalry has shattered the semblance of unity that may have existed among fossil fuel producers:

What we’re witnessing here is a fight to the death between the world’s leading oil and natural gas producers at a time when fossil fuel prices are collapsing across the board.

Combating climate change
The environmental impacts of fossil fuels, especially oil, led to government policies promoting the use of zero-carbon energy sources to prevent or slow climate change. Future action on such environmental concerns, ranging from climate change to smog, has severely hurt the notion that oil demand would forever rise. The EU implemented a bloc-wide carbon tax; many nations increased gas taxes and/or passed a carbon tax. Alternative energy sources, such as wind and solar, were being subsidized to support their use.

One commentator has said that the "energy revolution" has forced oil producers with large reserves to produce as much of their reserves as fast as possible, while oil still has energy value. Oil exporters are "unable to sit on their reserves to attempt a higher price tomorrow."

Effects

Venezuela

Under Hugo Chávez and his Bolivarian government, PDVSA resources were used to fund social programmes, with Chávez treating it like it had a surplus. His social policies resulted in overspending that caused shortages in Venezuela and allowed the inflation rate to grow to one of the highest rates in the world.

According to Cannon, the state income from oil revenue grew "from 51% of total income in 2000 to 56% 2006"; oil exports increased "from 77% in 1997 ... to 89% in 2006"; and his administration's dependence on petroleum sales was "one of the chief problems facing the Chávez government". By 2008, exports of everything but oil "collapsed". and in 2012, the World Bank  explained that Venezuela's economy is "extremely vulnerable" to changes in oil prices since in 2012 "96% of the country's exports and nearly half of its fiscal revenue" relied on oil production. When oil prices dropped in 2015, this worsened the crisis Venezuela was experiencing from the government's mismanagement. Venezuela's economic crisis has been called “the worst economic collapse outside of war since World War II.”

Cuba
Immediately after the death of Hugo Chávez, President Raul Castro sought a new benefactor as the oil that was shipped from Venezuela to Cuba began to slow. With Cuba needing new support, relations between the United States and Cuba began to be reestablished in 2014 during United States–Cuban Thaw.

However, in 2016, Cuba still relied on Venezuela's oil and economic assistance. With Cuba's economy slowing as a result of Venezuela's own crisis, many Cubans feared that their nation would soon return to having similar experiences to that of the Special Period, which occurred following the dissolution of the Soviet Union, which Cuba heavily relied on.

OPEC

The Organization of Petroleum Exporting Countries has been severely affected by the 2014 collapse in prices. Shale production robbed OPEC of a large portion of its market power, forcing OPEC to cooperate with other producers to keep prices up after Saudi Arabia effectively declared defeat in the price war in 2016.

Many OPEC members, such as Venezuela, Algeria, Libya, Iraq, Ecuador, and Nigeria, have had internal crisis spawned or worsened by the collapse in oil revenues. In many of these nations, the response to the 2011 Arab Spring was spending oil money for internal stability, which has caused financial troubles for these nations as oil revenue dried up.

See also
1980s oil glut
2000s energy crisis
2020 Russia–Saudi Arabia oil price war
2021–present global energy crisis
Arab Spring
Libyan Civil War
2017–2018 Iranian protests
2019–2021 Algerian protests
Petroleum politics

References

2010s economic history
2014 in the environment
2015 in the environment
2016 in the environment
Petroleum economics
History of the petroleum industry